Aigars Cipruss (born 12 January 1972) is a  Latvian professional ice hockey player currently playing for HK Ozolnieki/Monarhs hockey club. Until then he played for Dinamo Riga of the Kontinental Hockey League, and served as manager for this team and was coach in its farm club.

Playing career
A veteran centre, Cipruss last season played in Italy, regularly represented Latvia internationally till 2006th as well. Although he has played in the North American leagues, he has never been drafted by an NHL team.

Cipruss scored first goal in renewed Latvian national ice hockey team game on 26th second at 7 September 1992 against Lithuania national ice hockey team. After 2006 Winter Olympics announced that he retires from Latvia national team. He returned in Latvian national team in 2009.

Career statistics

Regular season and playoffs

International

References

External links
 
 

1972 births
Atlanta Fire Ants players
Atlanta Knights players
Dinamo Riga players
Expatriate ice hockey players in Russia
Grand Rapids Griffins (IHL) players
Asiago Hockey 1935 players
HC Spartak Moscow players
HIFK (ice hockey) players
Ice hockey players at the 2002 Winter Olympics
Ice hockey players at the 2006 Winter Olympics
Jokerit players
Lahti Pelicans players
Latvian expatriate sportspeople in Canada
Latvian expatriate sportspeople in the United States
Latvian ice hockey centres
Living people
Lukko players
Muskegon Fury players
Nashville Knights players
Olympic ice hockey players of Latvia
Providence Bruins players
Quebec Rafales players
SaiPa players
Soviet ice hockey centres
Ice hockey people from Riga
Latvian expatriate ice hockey people
Expatriate ice hockey players in Canada
Expatriate ice hockey players in the United States